della Pietà is an Italian surname, and may refer to:

 Agata della Pietà (circa 1800), Italian composer, singer, and teacher
 Michielina della Pietà (circa 1700), Italian composer, violinist, organist, and teacher
 Santa della Pietà (circa 1725-1774), Italian singer, composer, and violinist
 Anna Maria della Pietà (circa 1696-1782), Italian violinist, composer, and teacher
 Chiara della Pietà (1718-1791), Italian violinist, composer, and teacher

Surnames